Coffee County is a county located in the southeastern part of the U.S. state of Georgia. As of the 2020 census, the population was 43,092, up from 37,413 at the 2010 census. The county seat is Douglas.

Coffee County comprises the Douglas, GA Micropolitan Statistical Area.

History

Coffee County was created by an act of the Georgia General Assembly on February 9, 1854, from portions of Clinch, Irwin, Telfair, and Ware counties. These lands were originally ceded by the Creek in the Treaty of Fort Jackson in (1814) and the Treaty of the Creek Agency (1818) and apportioned to the above counties before becoming Coffee County.

Berrien (1856), Jeff Davis (1905), and Atkinson (1917) counties were subsequently formed from sections of Coffee County.

The county is named for General John E. Coffee, a state legislator and a U.S. representative.

Coffee County Correctional Facility is located in Nicholls, Georgia. It is privately owned and operated by CoreCivic, the largest prison company in the nation.

Many of the early settlers of what is now Coffee County are buried in historic cemeteries across the region, including the cemetery at Lone Hill United Methodist Church—located at 6833 Broxton-West Green Highway, some 10 miles northeast of Douglas.  The church and its cemetery date to the 1840s, with the earliest marked grave dated 1848.  A majestic Eastern Redcedar has graced the cemetery for generations and is recognized as the nation's largest of this species through American Forests’ Champion Trees program. (see:)   In July 2018 the tree was recognized as 2018's Great American Tree by American Grove.  ( See:)  Having been nominated by Mark McClellan of the Georgia Forestry Commission, the tree has been featured in such publications as the Smithsonian Magazine and Janisse Ray's Wild Card Quilt.  The circumference of the tree exceeds 20 feet.

Geography

The vast majority of Coffee County is located in the Satilla River sub-basin of the St. Marys-Satilla River basin. The northern corner of the county, well north of Broxton, an area bisected by State Route 107, is located in the Lower Ocmulgee River sub-basin of the Altamaha River basin. The very southwestern corner of Coffee County, northeast of Alapaha, is located in the Alapaha River sub-basin of the Suwannee River basin.

Highways

  U.S. Route 221
  U.S. Route 319
  U.S. Route 441
  State Route 31
  State Route 32
  State Route 64
  State Route 90
  State Route 107
  State Route 135
  State Route 158
  State Route 206
  State Route 206 Connector
  State Route 268

Adjacent counties

 Telfair County – north
 Jeff Davis County – northeast
 Bacon County – east
 Ware County – southeast
 Atkinson County – south
 Berrien County – southwest
 Irwin County – west
 Ben Hill County – west

Demographics

2000 census
As of the census of 2000, there were 37,413 people, 13,354 households, and 9,788 families living in the county.  The population density was 62 people per square mile (24/km2).  There were 15,610 housing units at an average density of 26 per square mile (10/km2).  The racial makeup of the county was 68.23% White, 25.88% Black or African American, 0.32% Native American, 0.56% Asian, 0.04% Pacific Islander, 4.04% from other races, and 0.92% from two or more races.  6.82% of the population were Hispanic or Latino of any race.

There were 13,354 households, out of which 37.30% had children under the age of 18 living with them, 53.50% were married couples living together, 15.20% had a female householder with no husband present, and 26.70% were non-families. 22.60% of all households were made up of individuals, and 8.90% had someone living alone who was 65 years of age or older.  The average household size was 2.69 and the average family size was 3.14.

In the county, the population was spread out, with 28.30% under the age of 18, 11.00% from 18 to 24, 30.30% from 25 to 44, 20.50% from 45 to 64, and 9.90% who were 65 years of age or older.  The median age was 32 years. For every 100 females there were 98.60 males.  For every 100 females age 18 and over, there were 97.00 males.

The median income for a household in the county was $30,710, and the median income for a family was $35,936. Males had a median income of $26,642 versus $20,644 for females. The per capita income for the county was $15,530.  About 15.30% of families and 19.10% of the population were below the poverty line, including 23.90% of those under age 18 and 21.10% of those age 65 or over.

2010 census
As of the 2010 United States Census, there were 42,356 people, 14,817 households, and 10,630 families living in the county. The racial makeup of the county was 64.7% white, 26.6% black or African American, 0.7% Asian, 0.3% American Indian, 6.3% from other races, and 1.4% from two or more races. Those of Hispanic or Latino origin made up 10.3% of the population. In terms of ancestry, 14.6% were English, 10.7% were American, and 5.8% were Irish.

Of the 14,817 households, 38.8% had children under the age of 18 living with them, 49.1% were married couples living together, 17.4% had a female householder with no husband present, 28.3% were non-families, and 24.1% of all households were made up of individuals. The average household size was 2.68 and the average family size was 3.18. The median age was 34.8 years.

The median income for a household in the county was $35,202 and the median income for a family was $39,880. Males had a median income of $33,590 versus $26,129 for females. The per capita income for the county was $16,664. About 18.3% of families and 21.3% of the population were below the poverty line, including 29.6% of those under age 18 and 18.4% of those age 65 or over.

2020 census

As of the 2020 United States Census, there were 43,092 people, 14,438 households, and 9,913 families residing in the county.

Education

Communities

Cities
 Ambrose
 Broxton
 Douglas
 Nicholls

Unincorporated communities
 Bushnell
 Sapps Still
 West Green

Politics

See also

 Coffee Road
 General Coffee State Park
 National Register of Historic Places listings in Coffee County, Georgia
 Sapps Still, Georgia
 Broxton Rocks
List of counties in Georgia

References

External links
 GeorgiaInfo Coffee County Courthouse History
 The New Georgia Encyclopedia entry for Coffee County
 Georgiagov.com info for Coffee County
 Coffee County historical marker

 
1854 establishments in Georgia (U.S. state)
Georgia (U.S. state) counties